A Lagged Fibonacci generator (LFG or sometimes LFib) is an example of a pseudorandom number generator. This class of random number generator is aimed at being an improvement on the 'standard' linear congruential generator. These are based on a generalisation of the Fibonacci sequence.

The Fibonacci sequence may be described by the recurrence relation:

Hence, the new term is the sum of the last two terms in the sequence. This can be generalised to the sequence:

In which case, the new term is some combination of any two previous terms. m is usually a power of 2 (m = 2M), often 232 or 264. The  operator denotes a general binary operation. This may be either addition, subtraction, multiplication, or the bitwise exclusive-or operator (XOR). These generators also tend to be very sensitive to initialisation.

Generators of this type employ k words of state (they 'remember' the last k values).

If the operation used is addition, then the generator is described as an Additive Lagged Fibonacci Generator or ALFG, if multiplication is used, it is a Multiplicative Lagged Fibonacci Generator or MLFG, and if the XOR operation is used, it is called a Two-tap generalised feedback shift register or GFSR. The Mersenne Twister algorithm is a variation on a GFSR.  The GFSR is also related to the linear-feedback shift register, or LFSR.

Properties of lagged Fibonacci generators 
The maximum period of lagged Fibonacci generators depends on the binary operation . If addition or subtraction is used, the maximum period is (2k − 1) × 2M−1. If multiplication is used, the maximum period is (2k − 1) × 2M−3, or 1/4 of period of the additive case. If bitwise xor is used, the maximum period is 2k − 1.

For the generator to achieve this maximum period, the polynomial:

y = xk + xj + 1

must be primitive over the integers mod 2. Values of j and k satisfying this constraint have been published in the literature. 

Another list of possible values for j and k is on page 29 of volume 2 of The Art of Computer Programming:

(24, 55), (38, 89), (37, 100), (30, 127), (83, 258), (107, 378), (273, 607), (1029, 2281), (576, 3217), (4187, 9689), (7083, 19937), (9739, 23209)

Note that the smaller number have short periods (only a few "random" numbers are generated before the first "random" number is repeated and the sequence restarts).

If addition is used, it is required that at least one of the first k values chosen to initialise the generator be odd. If multiplication is used, instead, it is required that all the first k values be odd, and further that at least one of them is ±3 mod 8.

Problems with LFGs 
In a paper on four-tap shift registers, Robert M. Ziff, referring to LFGs that use the XOR operator, states that "It is now widely known that such generators, in particular with the two-tap rules such as R(103, 250), have serious deficiencies. Marsaglia observed very poor behavior with R(24, 55) and smaller generators, and advised against using generators of this type altogether.  ... While these correlations are spread over the size  of the generator itself, they can evidently still lead to significant errors.". This only refers to the standard LFG where each new number in the sequence depends on two previous numbers. A three-tap LFG has been shown to eliminate some statistical problems such as failing the Birthday Spacings and Generalized Triple tests.

The initialization of LFGs is a very complex problem. The output of LFGs is very sensitive to initial conditions, and statistical defects may appear initially but also periodically in the output sequence unless extreme care is taken. Another potential problem with LFGs is that the mathematical theory behind them is incomplete, making it necessary to rely on statistical tests rather than theoretical performance.

Usage 
 Freeciv uses a lagged Fibonacci generator with {j = 24, k = 55} for its random number generator.
 The Boost library includes an implementation of a lagged Fibonacci generator.
 Subtract with carry, a lagged Fibonacci generator engine, is included in the C++11 library.
 The Oracle Database implements this generator in its DBMS_RANDOM package (available in Oracle 8 and newer versions).

See also 
Wikipedia page 'List of random number generators' lists other PRNGs including some with better statistical qualitites:
 Linear congruential generator
 ACORN generator
 Mersenne Twister
 Xoroshiro128+
 FISH (cipher)
 Pike
 VIC cipher

References 
Toward a universal random number generator, G.Marsaglia, A.Zaman

Pseudorandom number generators
Fibonacci numbers